The Choquette River is a tributary of the Stikine River, flowing west into that river just north of its confluence with the Iskut.  The river is named for Alexander "Buck" Choquette, discoverer of the strike which launched the Stikine Gold Rush and the first non-native settler in the region, who operated a store near here and also for a while the Hudson'a Bay Company post and border station at Stikine, then named Boundary.  The Choquette Glacier, at the head of the river and its source, and Mount Choquette are nearby; Mount Johnny in the same region is named for one of Choquette's many sons.

See also
Choquette Hot Springs Provincial Park
Great Glacier

References

Rivers of the Boundary Ranges
Stikine Country
Tributaries of the Stikine River